Selam Musa Salaria or Selam Musai (1857–1920) was one of the Albanian military leaders of the Vlora War. He died fighting at the advanced age of 63. Posthumously  he was awarded the People's Hero of Albania medal.

Life 
He was born in 1857 Salari, Tepelenë District, Gjirokaster County, Albania from a patriotic Albanian family. In 1912, during the Occupation of Albania (1912–1913), he fought against the Greek forces. He was wounded during the battles.

In 1920 he became a member of the National Defense Committee. He actively participated in the Battle of Vlora when he was 63 years old, and at Qafë-Koçi was killed on 12 June (at 22:00) 1920, putting himself in front of an artillery piece to defend his younger comrades and give them more courage to advance and attack.

See also
People's Hero of Albania

References

1857 births
1920 deaths
People from Tepelenë
People from Janina vilayet
19th-century Albanian people
20th-century Albanian people
Albanian nationalists
Heroes of Albania